Abraham Dwuma Odoom is a Ghanaian politician and member of the Seventh Parliament of the Fourth Republic of Ghana representing the Twifo Atti-Morkwa Constituency in the Central Region on the ticket of the New Patriotic Party. He is credited with developing a concept note behind Nigeria's 'successful' rice production story.

Early life and education 
Odoom was born on 11 August 1952 and hails from Twifo Ayaase in the Central Region of Ghana. He has a certificate in Political and Economic Change from the J. F. Kennedy School of Governance, Harvard University in 2007 and also a Diploma in Accounting from the University of Ghana in 1979.

Career 
Odoom was a Lead Consultant in Cocoa Redevelopment from June 2016 to 6 January 2017. He also worked at the Ministry of Agriculture and Natural Resources in Akwa Ibom State in Nigeria. He was also a Policy Advisor at Bill/Melinda Gates/J. A Kufuor Foundation Competitive African Rice Initiative Project in Nigeria from 2014 to May 2016.

Politics 
Odoom is a member of the New Patriotic Party. He was the member of parliament for Twifo Atti-Morkwa Constituency in the Central Region of Ghana from 2017 to 2021.

2016 election 
During the 2016 Ghanaian general election, Odoom won the Twifo Atti Morkwa Constituency parliamentary seat. He won with 21,231 votes making 58.2% of the total votes cast whilst the NDC parliamentary candidate Samuel Ato Amoah had 14,887 votes making 40.8% of the total votes cast, the PPP parliamentary candidate Abu Ayuba had 273 votes making 0.8% of the total votes cast and the CPP parliamentary candidate Ebenezer Appiah had 115 vote making 0.3% of the total votes cast.

Minister 
Odoom is the former Deputy Minister for Health during the Kufuor administration.

He is the former Deputy Minister for Local Government.

Committee 
Odoom was a member and Vice Chairman of the Parliamentary Select Committee on Food and Agriculture.

Personal life 
Odoom is a Christian.

Awards 
In 2004, he emerged the best District Chief Executive for the then Twifo Hemang Lower Denkyira District Assembly in Ghana.

In November 2019, he was presented with a Lifetime Achievement Honorary Award.

Philanthropy 
In June 2018, he presented motorbikes to teachers and agriculture extension officers in his constituency.

References

Ghanaian MPs 2017–2021
1952 births
Living people
New Patriotic Party politicians
People from Central Region (Ghana)